The Round House is a cylindrical, wood-frame residential building at 36 Atherton Street in the Spring Hill neighborhood of Somerville, Massachusetts, United States. It was built in 1856 by hardware manufacturer Enoch Robinson, and is considered an offshoot of the octagon house-style popularized by phrenologist Orson Fowler.

The exterior of the Round House features two flush stories, with a third stepped back behind a series of battlements and embrasures. Inside, the three-story structure contains a central rotunda topped with a glass skylight, with interconnected rooms branching off on each level. There are four rooms on the first floor, six rooms on the second floor and another four rooms on the third floor.

History
In the early 2000s, the privately owned house was unoccupied, its windows removed to the interior of the house, and the openings were covered with plywood. Its ornamentation was largely removed, and all of the ceilings were severely damaged from water. In a 1986 restoration program, students from Boston's North Bennet Street School did a small amount of work renovating the exterior, but the project fell apart and the house remained in a state of decay.

Historic Massachusetts (now Preservation MASS) placed the building on its list of Endangered Historic Resources for 1997.

By April, 2007, the Round House had been purchased by a local man who is also president of a general contracting firm.  Signs placed on the property in early January 2008 advertised nearby Diamond Edge Construction, and the thick brush filling the yard was largely removed.  According to a letter from Brandon Wilson, executive director of the Somerville Historic Preservation Commission, the building and property would be completely restored and would function as a single family residence when complete.

References

Further reading
 Letter from Brandon Wilson, Director of the Somerville Historic Preservation Commission: http://community.livejournal.com/davis_square/736223.html?thread=5901535#t5901535
 Zellie, Carol (1982, rev. 1990). Beyond the Neck: The Architecture and Development of Somerville, MA. St. Paul, Minnesota: Landscape Research for City of Somerville.
 Fishman, Sarah. "Plea is issued for Round House." Boston Globe, October 12, 1997. City Edition, City Weekly section, Somerville Notes, p. 4.

External links

 Article from Centers and Squares
 Image from ER Butler

Houses completed in 1856
Rotundas in the United States
Houses on the National Register of Historic Places in Somerville, Massachusetts